Dead End Derby (DED) is a women's flat track roller derby league based in Christchurch, New Zealand. The league currently consists of 4 teams. Two competitive adult travel teams, the "Death Stars" A team and "Living Dead Rollers" B team, 1 development team "Dead Seas" and 1 Juniors Team "The Rolling Dead". 

Dead End Derby has a successful competitive record with both travel teams competing nationwide.

Dead End Derby has Adult & Junior Learn to Skate programs as well as "Freshmeat" learn to roller derby programs. 

Dead End Derby have 2 officials crews, consisting of on skates referees and non-skating officials. 

Dead End Derby is a member of the Women's Flat Track Derby Association (WFTDA).

History
The league was founded in November 2007 by Cherry Blunt and her sister Crass, along with MissChevusMynx, Mystique, Bitch n Famous, Stevie Nails, Blood Angel and Ur shadow.

The league played its first bout in September 2009, splitting the league into two demonstration teams "Hellbound Harlots" and "School Assassination Squad". The game brought in the country's largest roller derby crowd to that date of around 2000 people.

From 2010 to 2012 the league held an internal competition between three intraleague teams, the Filthy Habits, Cellblock Brawlers and Carnage Academy, for the Tequila Mockingbird Cup. Carnage Academy were undefeated. From 2013 the intraleague competition was abandoned in favour of themed demonstration bouts.

In 2012, Dead End Derby put on a major bootcamp for fifty skaters, coached by Bonnie D.Stroir, a coach of Team USA.

DED was accepted into the Women's Flat Track Derby Association (WFTDA) Apprentice Program in July 2016, and became a full WFTDA member in July 2017.

Interleague competition
The league hosted its first interleague game in 2011, which was also New Zealand's first inter-island bout, against Richter City Roller Derby from Wellington.

In 2012 Dead End's All Stars entered New Zealand's first national roller derby tournament, "Derby Royale" in Palmerston North, hosted by Swamp City Roller Rats.  The team emerged with a 2-win, 2-loss record, defeating Mount Militia Derby Crew and River City Rollers before being beaten by Hellmilton Roller Ghouls and hosts and finalists Swamp City.

At the second Derby Royale tournament the following year, they achieved a 4-win, 2-loss record, losing only to eventual champions Pirate City Rollers and finalists Auckland Roller Derby League.

There was no national tournament or structured ranking system in place in New Zealand for 2014. In 2015 the All Stars were ranked #3 on Geex Quad's New Zealand roller derby strength rankings table. In 2016 they were losing finalists in the New Zealand Roller Derby Top 10 Champs competition and finished the year ranked #4 on the rankings table.

The Living Dead Rollers had an undefeated 2016 season, placing first in the Mainland Mayhem: South Island Division 2 Tournament.

International Competition 
Four skaters from the league were selected to play for Roller Derby Team New Zealand in the 2011 Roller Derby World Cup. Hurricane Hori, MissChevusMynx, Black Panther and Evil K Knevil.  The national team captain, Hurricane Hori, is a former Dead End Derby skater.  The New Zealand team placed 8th out of 13 teams.

In 2015, Evil was again picked to represent New Zealand at the Roller Derby World Cup. New Zealand were placed sixth.

Also in 2015, the DED All Stars played their first international bouts, at the Royale Rumble tournament in Australia, losing both games

In 2016 they returned to the same tournament, returning with a 2-win, 1-loss record.

WFTDA rankings

 NR = no end-of-year ranking assigned

References

Roller derby leagues in New Zealand
Roller derby leagues established in 2007
Sport in Christchurch
2007 establishments in New Zealand